The 2004–05 season  was Villarreal Club de Fútbol's 82nd season in existence and the club's 5th consecutive season in the top flight of Spanish football. In addition to the domestic league, Villarreal participated in this season's editions of the Copa del Rey and the UEFA Intertoto Cup. The season covered the period from 1 July 2004 to 30 June 2005.

Pre-season and friendlies

Competitions

Overall record

La Liga

League table

Results summary

Results by round

Matches

Copa del Rey

UEFA Cup

First round

Group stage

Knockout phase

Round of 32

Round of 16

Quarter-finals

UEFA Intertoto Cup

Second round

Third round

Semi-finals

Finals

References

Villarreal CF seasons
Villarreal